The Netherlands Handball Association (NHV) is the national Handball association in Netherlands. NHV organizes team handball within Dutch and represents the Dutch handball internationally. The Association is a member of the International Handball Federation (IHF) and European Handball Federation (EHF).

Leagues

Men
 BENE-League Handball (along with Belgium)
 NHV Eredivisie
 Eerste Divisie
 Tweede Divisie
 Hoofdklasse

Women
 NHV Eredivisie
 Eerste Divisie
 Tweede Divisie
 Hoofdklasse

national cups
 NHV Cup
 Super Cup

International

Men

Women

References

External links

European Handball Federation
Handball
Sports organizations established in 1935
1935 establishments in the Netherlands